Critonia is a genus of flowering plants in the tribe Eupatorieae of the family Asteraceae.

The most notable trait that characterizes the genus is the presence of pellucid punctations caused by internal secretory pockets of the leaves - to be seen these must be viewed with a hand lens while holding the leaf up to light in most species of the genus.  Most species of Critonia also have smooth opposite leaves, a shrubby habit, unenlarged style bases, relatively few (3-5) flowers per head, and imbricate involucres.

 Species
The genus is native to Mexico, Central America, South America, and the West Indies.

References

 
Asteraceae genera
Taxonomy articles created by Polbot